The West Indies rugby league team (nicknamed "The Wahoos") represented the Caribbean and West Indies region in the sport of rugby league football. Governed by the West Indies Rugby League Federation, the team played their only international against South Africa in 2004.

Like the Great Britain national rugby league team, the team split into individual nations following their 2004 international. Subsequently, Jamaica qualified for the 2021 Rugby League World Cup.

Represented nations and territories

Eligible players
 Guy Armitage (Trinidad and Tobago)
 Ryan Atkins (Grenada)
 Jake Connor (Trinidad and Tobago)
 Leroy Cudjoe (Grenada)
Kieran Dixon (Antigua) 
Keenan Dyer-Dixon (Dominica)
 Andy Gabriel (Dominican Republic)
Bernard Gregorius (Haiti)
 Jermaine McGillvary (Grenada)
 Ronan Michael (Antigua and Barbuda) 
Ryan Millar (Barbados)
Coby Nichol (Grenada)
Kai Pearce-Paul (Antigua)
Leon Ruan (Barbados)
James Thornton (Grenada)

History
The West Indies Rugby League Federation was formed in 2003. The West Indies team has participated in the Middlesex Nines (2004) and York Nines (2004, 2005) competitions.

The first thirteen-a-side game of rugby league played in the West Indies was at Kingston, Jamaica on July 13, 2005. A competition between the Vauxhall Vultures, Sharks, St Catherines, Army, and Nomads is scheduled to start in Kingston in August 2005.

The West Indies national side was planning to be involved in the 2008 Rugby League World Cup qualifying in the United States in 2006 but pulled out due to lack of funds.

Match vs South Africa
The West Indies' only international fixture was played against South Africa, then known as the Wild Dogs, on 9 October 2004 at New River Stadium in London, England, winning 50–22. Jamaican Jermaine Coleman was initially named to play but was replaced by Davey.

See also

 Jamaica national rugby league team

References

External links
 West Indies Rugby League Federation

National sports teams of the West Indies
National rugby league teams
Rugby league in the Caribbean